Beaver Mines is a hamlet in southern Alberta, Canada within the Municipal District of Pincher Creek No. 9.

History 
The community was formed with the opening of a coal mine in the early 1900s. At one time Beaver Mines had over 1,500 residents. Because of the requirement for steel (rail tracks) during the wars and the reduction in the need for coal, the coal mines eventually closed and the community residents moved away. The last mine shut down its operations in 1971 and currently the mine site and many of the building foundations are on private land. For the past 30 years Beaver Mines has been considered a ghost town and has had numerous write-ups in ghost town books.

Contemporary issues 
Currently, due largely to the expansion of Castle Mountain Resort and the growth of Calgary to the north, the hamlet has begun to grow again as a popular recreational destination.

Climate 
Beaver mines has a humid continental climate (Dfb) with mild to warm summers and cold, snowy winters with heavy snowfall for 8 months of the year. Late Spring and early Summer tends to be the wettest time of the year.

Demographics 

See also 
List of communities in Alberta
List of designated places in Alberta
List of hamlets in Alberta

References 

Hamlets in Alberta
Designated places in Alberta
Mining communities in Alberta
Municipal District of Pincher Creek No. 9